Sunshine Football Club may refer to

Sunshine Football Club (VFA), former Australian rules football club that competed in the Victorian Football Association
Sunshine Football Club (WRFL), Australian rules football club that competes in the Western Region Football League